In mathematics, a linear differential equation is a differential equation that is defined by a linear polynomial in the unknown function and its derivatives, that is an equation of the form 

Such an equation is an ordinary differential equation (ODE). A linear differential equation may also be a linear partial differential equation (PDE), if the unknown function depends on several variables, and the derivatives that appear in the equation are partial derivatives.

A linear differential equation or a system of linear equations such that the associated homogeneous equations have constant coefficients may be solved by quadrature, which means that the solutions may be expressed in terms of integrals. This is also true for a linear equation of order one, with non-constant coefficients. An equation of order two or higher with non-constant coefficients cannot, in general, be solved by quadrature. For order two, Kovacic's algorithm allows deciding whether there are solutions in terms of integrals, and computing them if any.

The solutions of homogeneous linear differential equations with polynomial coefficients are called holonomic functions. This class of functions is stable under sums, products, differentiation, integration, and contains many usual functions and special functions such as exponential function, logarithm, sine, cosine, inverse trigonometric functions, error function, Bessel functions and hypergeometric functions. Their representation by the defining differential equation and initial conditions allows making algorithmic (on these functions) most operations of calculus, such as computation of antiderivatives, limits, asymptotic expansion, and numerical evaluation to any precision, with a certified error bound.

Basic terminology

The highest order of derivation that appears in a (linear) differential equation is the order of the equation. The term , which does not depend on the unknown function and its derivatives, is sometimes called the constant term of the equation (by analogy with algebraic equations), even when this term is a non-constant function. If the constant term is the zero function, then the differential equation is said to be homogeneous, as it is a homogeneous polynomial in the unknown function and its derivatives. A differential equation has constant coefficients if only constant functions appear as coefficients in the associated homogeneous equation.

A  of a differential equation is a function that satisfies the equation.
The solutions of a homogeneous linear differential equation form a vector space. In the ordinary case, this vector space has a finite dimension, equal to the order of the equation. All solutions of a linear differential equation are found by adding to a particular solution any solution of the associated homogeneous equation.

Linear differential operator

A basic differential operator of order  is a mapping that maps any differentiable function to its th derivative, or, in the case of several variables, to one of its partial derivatives of order . It is commonly denoted 

in the case of univariate functions, and 

in the case of functions of  variables. The basic differential operators include the derivative of order 0, which is the identity mapping.

A linear differential operator (abbreviated, in this article, as linear operator or, simply, operator) is a linear combination of basic differential operators, with differentiable functions as coefficients. In the univariate case, a linear operator has thus the form

where  are differentiable functions, and the nonnegative integer  is the order of the operator (if  is not the zero function).

Let  be a linear differential operator. A linear differential operator is a linear operator, since it maps sums to sums and the product by a scalar to the product by the same scalar.

As the sum of two linear operators is a linear operator, as well as the product (on the left) of a linear operator by a differentiable function, the linear differential operators form a vector space over the real numbers or the complex numbers (depending on the nature of the functions that are considered). They form also a free module over the ring of differentiable functions.

The language of operators allows a compact writing for differentiable equations: if

is a linear differential operator, then the equation 

may be rewritten

The kernel of a linear differential operator is its kernel as a linear mapping, that is the vector space of the solutions of the (homogeneous) differential equation .

where  are arbitrary numbers.

Homogeneous equation with constant coefficients
A homogeneous linear differential equation has constant coefficients if it has the form

where  are (real or complex) numbers. In other words, it has constant coefficients if it is defined by a linear operator with constant coefficients.

The study of these differential equations with constant coefficients dates back to Leonhard Euler, who introduced the exponential function , which is the unique solution of the equation  such that .

Let 

Searching solutions of this equation that have the form  is equivalent to searching the constants  such that

Factoring out  (which is never zero), shows that  must be a root of the characteristic polynomial

of the differential equation, which is the left-hand side of the characteristic equation

When these roots are all distinct, one has  distinct solutions that are not necessarily real, even if the coefficients of the equation are real. Together they form a basis of the vector space of solutions of the differential equation (that is, the kernel of the differential operator).

In the case where the characteristic polynomial has only simple roots, the preceding provides a complete basis of the solutions vector space. In the case of multiple roots, more linearly independent solutions are needed for having a basis. These have the form

Thus, applying the differential operator of the equation is equivalent with applying first  times the operator  and then the operator that has  as characteristic polynomial. By the exponential shift theorem,

and thus one gets zero after  application of 

As, by the fundamental theorem of algebra, the sum of the multiplicities of the roots of a polynomial equals the degree of the polynomial, the number of above solutions equals the order of the differential equation, and these solutions form a base of the vector space of the solutions.

In the common case where the coefficients of the equation are real, it is generally more convenient to have a basis of the solutions consisting of real-valued functions. Such a basis may be obtained from the preceding basis by remarking that, if  is a root of the characteristic polynomial, then  is also a root, of the same multiplicity.

Second-order case
A homogeneous linear differential equation of the second order may be written 

and its characteristic polynomial is

In this case, the general solution is

 If , the characteristic polynomial has a double root , and the general solution is 

 If , the characteristic polynomial has two complex conjugate roots , and the general solution is 

which may be rewritten in real terms, using Euler's formula as

Non-homogeneous equation with constant coefficients
A non-homogeneous equation of order  with constant coefficients may be written

There are several methods for solving such an equation. The best method depends on the nature of the function  that makes the equation non-homogeneous. If  is a linear combination of exponential and sinusoidal functions, then the exponential response formula may be used. Still more general, the annihilator method applies when  satisfies a homogeneous linear differential equation, typically, a holonomic function.

The most general method is the variation of constants, which is presented here.

The general solution of the associated homogeneous equation 

is 

The method of variation of constants takes its name from the following idea. Instead of considering  as constants, they can be considered as unknown functions that have to be determined for making  a solution of the non-homogeneous equation. For this purpose, one adds the constraints

which imply (by product rule and induction)

Replacing in the original equation  and its derivatives by these expressions, and using the fact that  are solutions of the original homogeneous equation, one gets 

This system can be solved by any method of linear algebra. The computation of antiderivatives gives , and then .

As antiderivatives are defined up to the addition of a constant, one finds again that the general solution of the non-homogeneous equation is the sum of an arbitrary solution and the general solution of the associated homogeneous equation.

First-order equation with variable coefficients

If the equation is homogeneous, i.e. , one may rewrite and integrate:

Thus, the general solution of the homogeneous equation is

where  is an arbitrary constant.

For the general non-homogeneous equation, one may multiply it by the reciprocal  of a solution of the homogeneous equation. This gives 

As  the product rule allows rewriting the equation as

Thus, the general solution is

Example 
Solving the equation
 
The associated homogeneous equation  gives

that is 

Dividing the original equation by one of these solutions gives
 
That is 
 

and

For the initial condition
 
one gets the particular solution

System of linear differential equations

A system of linear differential equations consists of several linear differential equations that involve several unknown functions. In general one restricts the study to systems such that the number of unknown functions equals the number of equations.

An arbitrary linear ordinary differential equation and a system of such equations can be converted into a first order system of linear differential equations by adding variables for all but the highest order derivatives.

A linear system of the first order, which has  unknown functions and  differential equations may normally be solved for the derivatives of the unknown functions. If it is not the case this is a differential-algebraic system, and this is a different theory. Therefore, the systems that are considered here have the form

In matrix notation, this system may be written (omitting "")

The solving method is similar to that of a single first order linear differential equations, but with complications stemming from noncommutativity of matrix multiplication.

Let

be the homogeneous equation associated to the above matrix equation.
Its solutions form a vector space of dimension , and are therefore the columns of a square matrix of functions , whose determinant is not the zero function. In fact, in these cases, one has 

In the general case there is no closed-form solution for the homogeneous equation, and one has to use either a numerical method, or an approximation method such as Magnus expansion.

Knowing the matrix , the general solution of the non-homogeneous equation is

where the column matrix  is an arbitrary constant of integration.

If initial conditions are given as

the solution that satisfies these initial conditions is 

Higher order with variable coefficients
A linear ordinary equation of order one with variable coefficients may be solved by quadrature, which means that the solutions may be expressed in terms of integrals. This is not the case for order at least two. This is the main result of Picard–Vessiot theory which was initiated by Émile Picard and Ernest Vessiot, and whose recent developments are called differential Galois theory.

The impossibility of solving by quadrature can be compared with the Abel–Ruffini theorem, which states that an algebraic equation of degree at least five cannot, in general, be solved by radicals. This analogy extends to the proof methods and motivates the denomination of differential Galois theory.

Similarly to the algebraic case, the theory allows deciding which equations may be solved by quadrature, and if possible solving them. However, for both theories, the necessary computations are extremely difficult, even with the most powerful computers.

Nevertheless, the case of order two with rational coefficients has been completely solved by Kovacic's algorithm.

Cauchy–Euler equation
Cauchy–Euler equations are examples of equations of any order, with variable coefficients, that can be solved explicitly. These are the equations of the form
 
where  are constant coefficients.

 Holonomic functions

A holonomic function, also called  a D-finite function, is a function that is a solution of a homogeneous linear differential equation with polynomial coefficients.

Most functions that are commonly considered in mathematics are holonomic or quotients of holonomic functions. In fact, holonomic functions include polynomials, algebraic functions, logarithm, exponential function, sine, cosine, hyperbolic sine, hyperbolic cosine, inverse trigonometric and inverse hyperbolic functions, and many special functions such as Bessel functions and hypergeometric functions.

Holonomic functions have several closure properties; in particular, sums, products, derivative and integrals of holonomic functions are holonomic. Moreover, these closure properties are effective, in the sense that there are algorithms for computing the differential equation of the result of any of these operations, knowing the differential equations of the input.

Usefulness of the concept of holonomic functions results of Zeilberger's theorem, which follows.

A holonomic sequence is a sequence of numbers that may be generated by a recurrence relation with polynomial coefficients. The coefficients of the Taylor series at a point of a holonomic function form a holonomic sequence. Conversely, if the sequence of the coefficients of a power series is holonomic, then the series defines a holonomic function (even if the radius of convergence is zero). There are efficient algorithms for both conversions, that is for computing the recurrence relation from the differential equation, and vice versa''. 

It follows that, if one represents (in a computer) holonomic functions by their defining differential equations and initial conditions, most calculus operations can be done automatically on these functions, such as derivative, indefinite and definite integral, fast computation of Taylor series (thanks of the recurrence relation on its coefficients), evaluation to a high precision with certified bound of the approximation error, limits, localization of singularities, asymptotic behavior at infinity and near singularities, proof of identities, etc.

See also
 Continuous-repayment mortgage
 Fourier transform
 Laplace transform
 Linear difference equation
 Variation of parameters

References

External links
 http://eqworld.ipmnet.ru/en/solutions/ode.htm
 Dynamic Dictionary of Mathematical Function. Automatic and interactive study of many holonomic functions.

Differential equations